Redkollegia is an independent media award established by the Sreda Foundation headed by  to support free professional journalism in Russia. The prize is awarded monthly to several authors.

The organizers of the award believe that in this way they will be able to “help those who maintain high professional standards in Russia at a time when free and high-quality journalism is under pressure from the state, and the human rights to freedom of expression and free access to information are systematically violated."

Entry and prize consideration 
On the pages of the project, links are published daily to the materials of federal and regional publications collected by a group of experts. These materials are potential applicants for the award. Both authors and readers can nominate material for the award, informing the jury and experts about important publications.

Redkollegia is awarded to a specific author or group of authors for a specific journalistic text (investigation, reportage or interview) published in any available way: in the media, on a personal website, on a social network. The main selection criterion is a high professional level of the text. The audience and the number of readings do not matter. The minimum prize is two thousand dollars.

The jury considers authors of journalistic works that involve obtaining new socially significant information, direct work with information sources, and independent collection of information about events, phenomena, and processes taking place in reality as applicants for the award.

Jury 
The jury of Redkollegia:

 Dmitry Butrin — journalist, publicist, deputy editor-in-chief of the publishing house Kommersant
 Dmitry Kolezev — journalist, editor, founder and publisher of It’s My City (Yekaterinburg), former chief editor of 
 
 Yelizaveta Osetinskaya
 Ella Paneakh — publicist, sociologist, associate professor at the Higher School of Economics (St. Petersburg)
 Sergey Parkhomenko — journalist and publisher, host of the Essence of Events programme at the radio station Echo of Moscow
 Maxim Solyus — editor at the Organized Crime and Corruption Reporting Project, former editor in Kommersant, Vedomosti, RBK
  — editor-in-chief of the Wonderzine online magazine and a host of the Dozhd TV channel, former editor-in-chief of Forbes Woman and Forbes Life magazines
 Maxim Trudolyubov — Meduza, The New York Times columnist, publicist, editor of The Russia File

Experts and specialists 

 , a journalist, reporter, columnist for Vedomosti and media expert;
 Maria Zonina, a translator and editor;
 Elena Visens, a journalist, editor, former correspondent of RIA Novosti in Spain and former contributor of the newspaper El País;
 , a playwright and journalist;
 Leonid Moyzhes, a journalist, editor of the website redkollegia.org;
 Kirill Denisov, a journalist, blogger, editor of accounts in social networks of the Redkollegia award.

Award winners

References